Utetheisa pellex is a moth in the family Erebidae. It was described by Carl Linnaeus in 1758. It is found in New Guinea and surrounding islands (Waigeo, Salawati, Misool, Gebe, the Aru Islands, Supiori, Biak, Yapen, the Bismarck Archipelago, the Admiralty Islands, Vulcan Island, Dampier Island, D'Entrecasteaux Archipelago, the Louisiade Archipelago, Yule Island, the Darnley Islands), as well as in Australia (Queensland).

References

Moths described in 1758
Taxa named by Carl Linnaeus
pellex